Damdiny Demberel (born on April 15, 1941 in Mankhan Sum, Khovd Aimag) was the previous Speaker of the State Great Khural  of Mongolia.

Education 

In 1960, Demberel finished 10 year secondary school 1 of Khovd city.
In 1964, he graduated from the School of Economics, Ulaanbaatar majoring in Trading Economics and Technology
In 1977, he graduated from the Academy of Social Sciences, Moscow, Soviet Union majoring in politics.

Before 1990 

In 1964-1968, Demberel worked as Deputy Chief of the Trade and Procurement Administration of Khovd Aimag.
In 1968-1970, he was Director and Lecturer at the Political and Enlightenment Cabinet, Mongolian People's Revolutionary Party (MPRP) Committee of Khovd Aimag
In 1970-1972, he was First-Secretary of the Revolutionary Youth Union Committee of Khovd Aimag
In 1972-1975, he was Director of Union Organization Unit, Central Committee of the Mongolian Revolutionary Youth Union
In 1977-1990, he worked at the Central Committee, MPRP as an organizer and a group leader

After 1990 

In 1990-1992, Demberel was First-Secretary of the MPRP Committee of Zavkhan Aimag. In 1992, he was elected to the State Small Hural of Mongolia. Since then, he has not lost any election to the State Great Khural. He was elected as an MP five times, i.e., in 1992, 1996, 2000, 2004 and 2008 and has been serving his fifth term.
While he was a Member of Parliament, he held important posts in the State Great Hural, i.e., he was the Leader of the MPRP Group in the State Great Hural in 1992-1994, Chairman of the Standing Committee on Government Structure in 2000-2004, has been Minister for Social Welfare and Labor since 2007, and was Speaker of the State Great Hural from 2008 to 2012.

References

Sources 
Demberel's biography
Demberel's biography

Speakers of the State Great Khural
1941 births
Living people
Government ministers of Mongolia
Mongolian expatriates in the Soviet Union
Mongolian People's Party politicians
People from Khovd Province